Muhammad Nadhiif Rizqi Firdaus (born 17 February 2001) is an Indonesian professional footballer who plays as a central midfielder.

Club career

Persiraja Banda Aceh
He was signed for Persiraja Banda Aceh to play in Liga 1 in the 2021 season. Nadhiif made his first-team debut on 24 September 2021 as a substitute in a match against Persipura Jayapura at the Si Jalak Harupat Stadium, Soreang.

Career statistics

Club

Notes

References

External links
 Muhammad Nadhiif at Soccerway
 Muhammad Nadhiif at Liga Indonesia

2001 births
Living people
Indonesian footballers
Persiraja Banda Aceh players
Association football midfielders
Sportspeople from Bandung